Gonzalo Tiesi (born 24 April 1985 in Buenos Aires) is a retired Argentine rugby union player.
Tiesi played for the London Irish, Harlequins, Stade Français, London Welsh and Newcastle Falcons, as for 31 December 2012 won 32 full caps for his national team, Los Pumas.
His usual position was at centre.

Tiesi formerly played for the San Isidro Club, in the north of Buenos Aires.
Prior to signing with Harlequins he played for London Irish. He has also represented Argentina Sevens at the IRB Sevens event in Los Angeles. He also played for Buenos Aires Rugby Union in 2005 and previously represented Argentina at both under-21 and under-19 level.

He was part of the Argentine squad for the 2007 Rugby World Cup which succeed in gaining Argentina's highest world cup finish of third place and Argentine squad for the 2011 Rugby World Cup in New Zealand.

At the end of 2011–12 season he left France for getting back to San Isidro Club of Argentina; in January 2013 Tiesi was signed by the London Welsh. On 6 November 2013, he signed for Newcastle Falcons in the Aviva Premiership.

References

External links
  Gonzalo Tiesi at UAR.com.ar
 Gonzalo Tiesi on london-irish.com
 Gonzalo Tiesi signs for London Irish

Argentine rugby union players
Argentina international rugby union players
Harlequin F.C. players
London Irish players
Newcastle Falcons players
San Isidro Club rugby union players
Stade Français players
Rugby union centres
Rugby union players from Buenos Aires
1985 births
Living people
Argentine people of Italian descent
Argentine expatriate rugby union players
Expatriate rugby union players in France
Expatriate rugby union players in England
Argentine expatriate sportspeople in France
Argentine expatriate sportspeople in England
Argentina international rugby sevens players
Male rugby sevens players